The following is a list of commuter rail  systems in the United States, ranked by ridership. All figures come from the American Public Transportation Association's (APTA) Ridership Reports Statistics for the Fourth Quarter of 2019, unless otherwise indicated.


List

See also
Commuter rail in North America
List of rail transit systems in the United States
List of United States light rail systems by ridership
List of United States local bus agencies by ridership
List of United States rapid transit systems by ridership

Notes

References

 
Commuter rail systems